Mahendrapalli Tirumeni Azhagar Temple (மகேந்திரப்பள்ளி திருமேனியழகர் கோயில்) is a Hindu temple located at Mahendirapalli in Mayiladuthurai district of Tamil Nadu, India.  The presiding deity is Shiva. He is called as Tirumeni Azhagar. His consort is known as Vadivambigai.

Significance 
It is one of the shrines of the 275 Paadal Petra Sthalams - Shiva Sthalams glorified in the early medieval Tevaram poems by Tamil Saivite Nayanar Tirugnanasambandar. It is believed that Mahendra worshipped Shiva here and hence the place came to be known as Mahendrapalli. The temple is counted as one of the temples built on the northern banks of River Kaveri. This temple is located on the southern banks of Kollidam River.

Literary Mention 
Tirugnanasambandar describes the feature of the deity as:

References

External links 
 
 

Shiva temples in Mayiladuthurai district
Padal Petra Stalam